Bestias De Asalto is an industrial-electro band from Mexico. The group consists of Psycommander (vocals), Enfermo (drums) and Tripas (keyboards and sampling). BDA music is based on a military concept and a war ambience, with explicit lyrics about massacres, combats, punishment, assassinations and slaughters. Their style is a combination of electro-industrial-metal, taking different influences of each gender, mixing and creating different ambiences and atmospheres.

Bestias De Asalto's first album was released on November 6, 2012, under the  extinct label "Engraved Ritual". After this, BDA signed with the German label Cop International, releasing their second full-length album called Sectas de la Guerra, in October 2014.

Albums:

Homenaje A La Violencia (2012)

Sectas De La Guerra (2014)

References

http://www.copint.com/ddtonline.asp?searchstring=Bestias%20De%20Asalto
http://www.discogs.com/artist/2927699-Bestias-De-Asalto
https://www.facebook.com/bestiasdeasalto

Mexican musical groups